Ayam Kedu is a breed of chicken, originating in Indonesia. It is one of the ancestors of Ayam Cemani

Name
Ayam means chicken in Indonesian language and Kedu is name of village on Kedu Plain on Central Java.

Description
A medium sized hard-feathered bird. 
Mainly three varieties known- (1) Kedu Kedu- a large white-skinned bird with a large red or black comb; (2) Kedu Cemani- a medium-sized black-skinned and black combed bird and (3) Kedu Hsian- a partridge variety with white skin and a red comb. Another variety also known to be existed, but its description can't be collected. 

Plumage colors: black, white and partridge. 

Weight: Rooster: 2.27 – 3.63 kg. Hen: 1.18 – 2.72 kg. 

Purposes: Considered as a ritual bird in Indonesia. Also, Chinese uses the bird as medicine. Lays around 160 standard brown eggs per year.

Varieties of Kedu Chicken
 Kedu black chicken, whole body and black feathers and cloaca retaining red coloration    
 Kedu white chicken, with white coat color    
 Kedu red chicken, with a furry black and red comb

References

Chicken breeds originating in Indonesia
Chicken breeds